The 2014 Walt Disney World Pro Soccer Classic was the fifth edition of the Walt Disney World Pro Soccer Classic, a pre-season exhibition tournament held at the ESPN Wide World of Sports Complex at the Walt Disney World Resort in Bay Lake, Florida. The 2014 edition was reportedly set to feature a field of eight teams including 5 MLS teams, two international teams, and USL Pro's Orlando City.  However, the schedule was released with 6 MLS teams, one international team, and Orlando City.

The defending champions were the Montreal Impact.

The 2014 tournament was won by last year's runners-up, the Columbus Crew SC, who defeated the reigning MLS Cup champions Sporting Kansas City 4–1 in the final.

Teams
The following clubs have confirmed their entry into the tournament.

Matches  
The schedule was released on the official website on January 13, 2014.

Group stage

Group A

Group B

Championship round

Notes

References

External links
 Official Site

Walt Disney World Pro Soccer Classic
2014
Walt Disney World Pro Soccer Classic